
Year 846 (DCCCXLVI) was a common year starting on Friday (link will display the full calendar) of the Julian calendar.

Events 
 By place 
 Byzantine Empire 
 Byzantine–Bulgarian War: The Bulgarians violate the peace treaty (see 815), and invade Macedonia along the River Struma. The cities of Serres and Philippi are devastated.

 Europe 
 Summer – Breton forces under Nominoe occupy the Frankish cities of Nantes and Rennes. He makes raids in Anjou and threatens Bayeux. King Charles the Bald recognizes him as duke of Brittany.
 Prince Pribina becomes a vassal of the Frankish Empire. King Louis the German grants him land near Lake Balaton (modern Hungary). He establishes Blatnohrad, capital of Balaton Principality.
 Frankish forces led by Louis the German invade Moravia. They encounter little resistance, and depose King Mojmir I from the throne. His relative, Rastislav, is set up as the new client ruler.
 Muslim forces attempt to raid Rome but only pillage the countryside around the city before being beaten back by Duke Guy I of Spoleto. In the aftermath, Pope Leo IV starts walling the area around the Vatican hill, creating the Leonine City 
 The Mozarabs, Iberian Christians who live under Moorish rule, try to repopulate León in Al-Andalus (modern Spain). The city is recaptured by the Muslim Arabs.

 Britain 
 King Æthelred II of Northumbria sends military assistance to the Picts, in their fight against the invading Scots (approximate date).

 Ireland 
 Máel Sechnaill mac Máele Ruanaid becomes the first High King of Ireland.

 Arabian Empire 
 A Saracen Arab expeditionary force from Africa, consisting of 11,000 men and 500 horses, raid the outskirts of Rome, sacking the basilicas of Old St. Peter's and St. Paul's Outside the Walls.

 Asia 
 April 22 – Emperor Wu Zong (Li Chan) dies after a 6-year reign. He is succeeded by his uncle Xuān Zong, as Chinese ruler of the Tang Dynasty.
 Jang Bogo, a powerful maritime hegemon of Silla, is assassinated by aristocratic elements at his garrison headquarters by Yeom Jang (or 841).

Births 
 Gyeongmun, king of Silla (Korea) (d. 875)
 November 1 – Louis the Stammerer, king of West Francia (d. 879)
 Du Xunhe, Chinese poet (d. 904)
 Hasan al-Askari, 11th Shia Imam (d. 874)
 Li Yi, Chinese poet (approximate date)
 Rollo, Viking leader and count (approximate date)
 Wang Chao, Chinese warlord (d. 898)
 Zhang Chengye, Chinese eunuch official (d. 922)

Deaths 
 April 22 – Wu Zong, emperor of the Tang Dynasty (b. 814)
 July 29 – Li Shen, chancellor of the Tang Dynasty
 Bai Ju Yi, Chinese poet and official (b. 772)
 Dantivarman, king of the Pallava Empire (India)
 Ferdomnach, Irish monk and illuminator
 Jang Bogo, Korean maritime hegemon (or 841)
 Joannicius the Great, Byzantine theologian (b. 752)
 Li Zongmin, chancellor of the Tang Dynasty
 Mojmir I, king of Moravia (approximate date)
 Niall Caille, High King of Ireland
 Reginbert of Reichenau, German librarian
 Seguin II, Frankish nobleman
 Wang, concubine of Wu Zong

References

Sources